The following is a list of cathedrals in Mexico.

Roman Catholic 

Cathedrals of the Roman Catholic Church in Mexico:
 Catedral Nuestra Señora de la Soledad in Acapulco
 Catedral Basílica de Nuestra Señora de la Asunción in Aguascalientes
 Cathedral of the Immaculate Conception in Apatzingan
 Catedral de la Divina Providencia in Atlacomulco
 Cathedral of the Holy Trinity in Autlán
 Cathedral of Our Lady of the Immaculate Conception in Campeche
 Cathedral of the Most Pure Conception in Celaya
 Cathedral of the Sacred Heart of Jesus in Chetumal
 Metropolitan Cathedral of the Holy Cross, Our Lady of Regla and St. Francis of Assisi in Chihuahua
 Co-Cathedral of the Assumption in Chilapa
 Cathedral of the Assumption in Chilpancingo
 Cathedral of St. John the Baptist in Ciudad Altamirano
 Cathedral of St. Joseph in Ciudad Guzmán
 Catedral de Nuestra Señora de Guadalupe in Ciudad Juárez
 Cathedral of Jesus Lord of Mercy in Ciudad Nezahualcóyotl
 Cathedral of the Sacred Heart of Jesus in Ciudad Obregón
 Catedral de Nuestra Señora de Guadalupe in Ciudad Valles
 Cathedral of the Sacred Heart of Jesus in Ciudad Victoria
 Cathedral of St. Joseph in Coatzacoalcos
 Cathedral Basilica of Our Lady of Guadalupe in Colima
 Cathedral of the Immaculate Conception in Córdoba
 Cathedral of St. Anthony in Cuauhtémoc
 Cathedral of St. Bonaventure in Cuautitlán
 Cathedral of the Assumption of Mary in Cuernavaca
 Cathedral Basilica of Our Lady of the Rosary in Culiacán
 Cathedral Basilica of Our Lady in Durango
 Cathedral of the Sacred Heart of Jesus in Ecatepec de Morelos
 Cathedral of Our Lady of Guadalupe in El Salto
 Cathedral of Our Lady of Guadalupe in Ensenada
 Cathedral of Our Lady of Guadalupe in Gómez Palacio
 Cathedral Basilica of the Assumption of Our Lady in Guadalajara
 Cathedral of the Assumption in Hermosillo
 Cathedral of Our Lady of Guadalupe in Huajuapan de León
 Catedral de San Juan Evangelista in Huautla de Jiménez
 Cathedral of St. Augustine in Huejutla de Reyes
 Catedral de Nuestra Señora de la Soledad in Irapuato
 Catedral de Nuestra Señora de la Paz in La Paz
 Cathedral of Christ the King in Lázaro Cárdenas
 Cathedral Basilica of Our Lady of the Light in León
 Cathedral of St. Philip in Linares
 Cathedral of Our Lady of Refuge in Matamoros
 Cathedral of the Immaculate Conception in Matehuala
 Cathedral Basilica of the Immaculate Conception in Mazatlán
 Cathedral of St. Ildephonsus in Mérida
 Catedral de Nuestra Señora de Guadalupe in Mexicali
 Cathedral of the Assumption in Mexico City
 Cathedral of Our Lady of Monterrey in Monterrey
 Catedral de Morelia (San Salvador) in Morelia
 Cathedral of the Miraculous Medal in Nuevo Casas Grandes
 Catedral del Espíritu Santo (Cathedral of the Holy Spirit) in Nuevo Laredo
 Cathedral of Our Lady of the Assumption in Oaxaca
 Cathedral of St. Michael the Archangel in Orizaba
 Cathedral of the Assumption of Our Lady in Papantla
 Cathedral of St. Joseph in Parral
 Catedral Mártires de Cristo Rey in Piedras Negras
 Cathedral of the Immaculate Conception in Puebla
 Catedral de Nuestra Señora de la Soledad in Puerto Escondido
 Cathedral of St. Philip Neri in Querétaro
 Cathedral of St. James in Saltillo
 Cathedral of St. Joseph and St. Andrew in San Andrés Tuxtla
 Cathedral of San Cristóbal de las Casas
 Cathedral of St. John the Baptist in San Juan Bautista Tuxtepec
 Cathedral Basilica of Our Lady of San Juan de los Lagos in San Juan de los Lagos
 Cathedral of St. John the Baptist in San Juan Teotihuacan
 Metropolitan Cathedral of St. Louis the King in San Luis Potosí
 Cathedral of St. Dominic in Santo Domingo Tehuantepec
 Co-Cathedral of Sisoguichi
 Cathedral of St. Jerome in Tacámbaro
 Cathedral of the Immaculate Conception in Tampico
 Cathedral of St. Joseph in Tapachula
 Cathedral of the Immaculate Conception of Mary in Tehuacan
 Cathedral of the Calvary in Tenancingo
 Cathedral of the Immaculate Conception in Tepic
 Cathedral of the Immaculate Conception in Texcoco
 Our Lady of the Assumption Cathedral, Teziutlán
 Cathedral of Our Lady of Guadalupe in Tijuana
 New Cathedral of Our Lady of Guadalupe in Tijuana (under construction)
 Catedral de Corpus Christi in Tlalnepantla
 Cathedral of St. Augustine in Tlapa de Comonfort
 Cathedral of Our Lady of the Assumption in Tlaxcala
 Cathedral of St. Joseph of Nazareth in Toluca
 Catedral de Nuestra Señora de Carmen in Torreón
 Cathedral of St. John the Baptist in Tulancingo
 St. Joseph Cathedral, Tula de Allende
 St. Mark's Cathedral, Tuxtla Gutiérrez
 Catedral de Nuestra Señora de la Asunción in Tuxpan
 Cathedral of St. Juan Diego in Valle de Chalco
 Cathedral of the Assumption of Mary in Veracruz
 Cathedral of the Lord in Villahermosa
 Cathedral of the Immaculate Conception in Xalapa
 Cathedral Basilica of Our Lady of the Assumption in Zacatecas
 Cathedral of the Immaculate Conception of Mary in Zamora

Eastern Catholic
 Maronite Church of Nuestra Señora de Valvanera in Mexico City (Maronite Rite)

See also
List of cathedrals
Roman and Eastern Catholicism in Mexico

References

External links

 
Mexico
Cathedrals
Cathedrals